Flavisolibacter ginsenosidimutans is a Gram-negative, rod-shaped, aerobic and non-motile  bacterium from the genus of Flavisolibacter which has been isolated from soil from a ginseng field from Pocheon in Korea.

References

Chitinophagia
Bacteria described in 2015